Thomas Street (also spelled Streete) (1621–1689) was an English astronomer, known for his writings on celestial motions. He has sometimes been confused with Thomas Street the judge, who lived from 1626 to 1696. The crater Street on the Moon is named after him.

Life
According to Brief Lives by Street's contemporary John Aubrey, Street was born at Castle Lyons in Ireland on 5 March 1621, and died "in Chanon-row (vulgarly Channel-rowe) at Westminster, the 17th August, 1689, and is buried in the church yard of the new chapell there".

Astronomy
On 3 May 1661 Streete observed a transit of Mercury from Long Acre in London with Nicholas Mercator and Christiaan Huygens. Streete subsequently disputed Hevelius observation of this event. The same year also saw Streete publishing Astronomia Carolina, a new theorie of Coelestial Motions.  An Appendix to Astronomia Carolina (including tables) followed in 1664. Astronomia Carolina was widely read, and used by students who later became very notable in their own right, e.g. Isaac Newton and John Flamsteed.  It was from Astronomia Carolina that Flamsteed learned how to calculate eclipses and planetary positions. Street's tables in Astronomia Carolina had a reputation for accuracy:  for example, Flamsteed once referred to them as "the exactest tables in being, the Caroline", and Astronomia Carolina itself appeared in second and third editions as late as 1710 and 1716.

1674 saw the appearance of Street's Description and Use of the Planetary Systeme together with Easie Tables, as well as, in the same year, Tables of Projection for artillery, accompanying a work on gunnery by Robert Anderson.

A follower of Johannes Kepler, Street argued, like Kepler, that Earth's rate of daily rotation is not uniform. He argued that the rotation increased as it approached the Sun.

Other achievements
Street invented an improved back-staff, a modification of an earlier instrument by Robert Hooke, adding to the device two planes and a small mirror.

Personality

One of Street's pamphlets described how he engaged in a vigorous polemic with Vincent Wing, his astronomical competitor, who had published a criticism of Street's Astronomia Carolina.

Edmond Halley (1656–1742), Street's much younger contemporary, wrote of Street as his 'good friend' (according to Halley's biographer), and said that they had observed a lunar eclipse together. Halley wrote an appendix to the 1710 edition of Street's Astronomia Carolina, and Cajori (op. cit.) said that Halley actually 'brought out' that 1710 edition.

Notes

17th-century English astronomers
Irish astronomers
1621 births
1689 deaths
British scientific instrument makers
17th-century Irish people
People from County Cork